Enthymius is a genus of beetle in the family Cerambycidae, and the only species in the genus is Enthymius dubius. It was described by Waterhouse in 1878.

References

Dorcasominae
Beetles described in 1878
Monotypic Cerambycidae genera